Nevado Olivares also known as Cerro de Olivares, is a mountain in the Andes Mountains at the Chile-Argentina border. It lies just south of the Agua Negra Pass, one of the highest road passes in the Andes.

See also
List of mountains in the Andes

References 

Mountains of Argentina
Mountains of Chile
Principal Cordillera
Mountains of Coquimbo Region
Mountains of San Juan Province, Argentina